Sulaiman Khamis Humaid Al-Mazroui (born 13 September 1972), commonly known as Sulaiman Al-Mazroui, is an Omani former footballer who played as a goalkeeper. He played his entire club career for Muscat Club. He is also currently the longest serving player of the national team for a total of 15 years of representing Oman. Although he was a goalkeeper, in the early part of his career he was an outfield player. He was also the captain of the national team.

International career
Sulaiman was part of the first team squad of the Oman national football team till 2007. He has made appearances in the 2002 FIFA World Cup qualification and the 2007 AFC Asian Cup qualification and has represented the national team in the 2006 FIFA World Cup qualification and the 2007 AFC Asian Cup.

References

External links
 
 
 Sulaiman Al-Mazroui - GOAL.com

1972 births
Living people
Omani footballers
Oman international footballers
Association football goalkeepers
2007 AFC Asian Cup players
Muscat Club players
Footballers at the 1998 Asian Games
Footballers at the 2006 Asian Games
Asian Games competitors for Oman